Earle Hodgins (October 6, 1893 – April 14, 1964) was an American actor.

Career
Early in his career, Hodgins was active in stock theater, including working in the Ralph Cloninger troupe of Salt Lake City, Utah, and the Siegel Stock company of Seattle, Washington.

He appeared in more than 330 films and television shows between 1932 and 1963. He specialized in playing fast-talking con men—often in westerns, such as The Lone Ranger, Judge Roy Bean, The Cisco Kid, The Adventures of Wild Bill Hickok, Rawhide, Maverick (in the episode "Shady Deal at Sunny Acres" with James Garner and Jack Kelly), Lawman, The Rifleman, Cheyenne, Have Gun – Will Travel, Gunsmoke (In a recurring role as the town judge, plus in the title role in “Uncle Oliver”, where he ambushes and shoots “Chester”), and Hopalong Cassidy. In 1959 Hodgins appeared as Mr. Fane on Lawman in the episode "The Outsider." In the 1960–1961 season, he appeared in three episodes of Joanne Dru's ABC sitcom, Guestward, Ho! as the aging ranch wrangler known as "Lonesome." In one of those episodes, "Lonesome's Gal", he was cast opposite ZaSu Pitts. Thereafter, the two died within a year of each other.

Hodgins' other television roles were as carnival barkers, medicine-show salesmen, and the like. He was known for shooing away obstreperous children from his stage, snapping at them, "Get away, son, ya bother me".

Hodgins married Sue Hanley, who was described in an article of the Salt Lake Telegram as "a Seattle society girl."

Hodgins was a member of the Church of Jesus Christ of Latter-day Saints.

Selected filmography

 The Circus Clown (1934) (First credited film role)
 Paradise Canyon (1935)
 Aces and Eights (1936)
 Oh, Susanna! (1936)
 Border Caballero (1936)
 Ticket to Paradise (1936)
 I Cover the War (1937)
 Range Defenders (1937)
 Heroes of the Alamo (1937)
 A Lawman Is Born (1937)
 Round-Up Time in Texas (1937)
 Sky Racket (1937)
 Nation Aflame (1937)
 Texas Trail (1937)
 Outlaws of the Prairie (1937)
 Roaring Six Guns (1937)
 The Purple Vigilantes (1938)
 The Old Barn Dance (1938)
 Barefoot Boy (1938)
 Call the Mesquiteers (1938)
 Lawless Valley (1938)
 The Rangers' Round-Up (1938)
 Long Shot (1939)
 Law and Order (1940)
 The Range Busters (1940)
 The Sagebrush Family Trails West (1940)
 Under Texas Skies (1940)
 Scattergood Baines (1941)
 Red River Robin Hood (1942)
 The Bashful Bachelor (1942)
 Inside the Law (1942)
 Hoppy Serves a Writ (1943)
 The San Antonio Kid (1944)
 The Utah Kid (1944)
 Mystery of the River Boat (1944)
 Oregon Trail (1945)
 Gun Smoke (1945)
 Unexpected Guest (1947)
 Oregon Trail Scouts (1947)
 Vigilantes of Boomtown (1947)
 Borrowed Trouble (1948)
 Oklahoma Badlands (1948)
 Henry, the Rainmaker (1949)
 Jiggs and Maggie in Jackpot Jitters (1949)
 Up in Smoke (1957)
 Saintly Sinners'' (1962) (Last credited film role)

Selected television

References

External links

1893 births
1964 deaths
American male film actors
American male television actors
Male actors from Salt Lake City
20th-century American male actors
American Latter Day Saints